Mount Livermore may refer to:
 Mount Caroline Livermore on Angel Island (California)
 Mount Livermore (Texas) in the Davis Mountains of Texas
 Livermore Peak (Maine)	
 Mount Livermore (New Hampshire)